The Gulfport School District is a public school district based in Gulfport, Mississippi (USA).

Schools

High school
Gulfport High School

Middle schools
Bayou View Middle School
2008 National Blue Ribbon School
Gulfport Central Middle School

Elementary schools
Anniston Avenue Elementary School
Bayou View Elementary School
Central Elementary School
Gaston Point Elementary School
Pass Road Elementary School
West Elementary School
Twenty-Eighth Street Elementary School

Demographics

2006-07 school year
There were a total of 5,480 students enrolled in the Gulfport School District during the 2006–2007 school year. The gender makeup of the district was 50% female and 50% male. The racial makeup of the district was 52.45% African American, 42.90% White, 3.14% Hispanic, 1.30% Asian, and 0.22% Native American. 56.4% of the district's students were eligible to receive free lunch.

Previous school years

Accountability statistics

See also
List of school districts in Mississippi

References

External links
 

Gulfport, Mississippi
Education in Harrison County, Mississippi
School districts in Mississippi